Jinniu District is one of 11 urban districts of the prefecture-level city of Chengdu, the capital of Sichuan Province, Southwest China. It is bordered by Chenghua District to the east, Qingyang District to the southwest, Pi County to the northwest, and Xindu District to the north.

Education

Malvern College Chengdu, an international school, is in the district.

Tourist attractions
Tourist attractions in Jinniu District include:

 Chengdu Museum of Contemporary Art
 Chengdu Tianfu Art Museum
 Phoenix Mountain Mosque
 Tianfu Art Park (see also Yinggui Lake)

Many of these cultural attractions were established as part of the 2021 Chengdu Biennale.

References

External links
 

Districts of Chengdu